The 2018 Tianjin Open was a women's professional tennis tournament played on hard courts. It was the 5th edition of the tournament, and part of the 2018 WTA Tour. It took place at the Tuanbo International Tennis Centre in Tianjin, China between 8 and 14 October 2018.

Points and prize money

Point distribution

Prize money

1 Qualifiers prize money is also the Round of 32 prize money
* per team

Singles main-draw entrants

Seeds 

 1 Rankings are as of October 1, 2018

Other entrants 

The following players received wildcards into the singles main draw: 
  Liu Fangzhou
  Karolína Plíšková 
  Yuan Yue

The following player received entry through a protected ranking:
  Timea Bacsinszky

The following players received entry from the qualifying draw:
  Jana Čepelová
  Misaki Doi
  Barbora Krejčíková
  Veronika Kudermetova
  Xun Fangying
  Zhang Yuxuan

Withdrawals
 Victoria Azarenka → replaced by  Katie Boulter
 Mihaela Buzărnescu → replaced by  Duan Yingying
 Maria Sharapova → replaced by  Wang Yafan

Retirements
  Danielle Collins
  Kateryna Kozlova
  Petra Martić
  Elise Mertens

Doubles main-draw entrants

Seeds 

1 Rankings are as of October 1, 2018

Other entrants 
The following pairs received wildcards into the doubles main draw:
  Guo Hanyu /  Zhu Lin
  Liu Yanni /  Wang Meiling

The following pair received entry as alternates:
  Ankita Raina /  Emily Webley-Smith

Withdrawals
Before the tournament
  Gabriela Dabrowski

Retirements
  Lara Arruabarrena

Champions

Singles 

  Caroline Garcia def.  Karolína Plíšková 7–6(9–7), 6–3

Doubles 

  Nicole Melichar /  Květa Peschke def.  Monique Adamczak /  Jessica Moore 6–4, 6–2

References

External links 
 

Tianjin Open
Tianjin Open
Tianjin Open
Tianjin Open